The 2007 Italian Open (also known for 2007 Rome Masters and the sponsored name 2007 Internazionali BNL d'Italia) was the 2007 edition of the Italian Open tennis tournament. The men's tournament was part of the 2007 ATP Masters Series and was held on May 5-13.  The women's event was a 2007 WTA Tier I Series event and was held on May 13–20.

Rafael Nadal was crowned champion for a record third consecutive year, and equalled Thomas Muster's overall record of three wins. Filippo Volandri, conqueror of Roger Federer, became the first Italian man to reach the semi-final stage since 1978, leaving Mara Santangelo as the only Italian among the winners for this year, triumphing in the women's doubles along with Nathalie Dechy of France.

Jelena Janković won her third title of the year after considering retirement during the previous year.

Finals

Men's singles

 Rafael Nadal defeated  Fernando González 6–2, 6–2

Women's singles

 Jelena Janković defeated  Svetlana Kuznetsova 7–5, 6–1

Men's doubles

 Fabrice Santoro /  Nenad Zimonjić defeated  Bob Bryan /  Mike Bryan 6–4, 6–7 (4–7), [10–7]

Women's doubles

 Nathalie Dechy /  Mara Santangelo defeated  Tathiana Garbin /  Roberta Vinci 6–4, 6–1

References
general
Men's Singles draw
Men's Doubles draw
 
specific

External links
Homepage

Italian Open
Italian Open
 
2007 Italian Open (Tennis)
Tennis